Tjøtta Russian War Cemetery on Tjøtta has more than 7,500 war graves, mostly Russians who were taken prisoners by Nazi Germany. The Soviet prisoners of war who died in North Norway during World War II were buried in ordinary cemeteries.  After the war, however, the Norwegian authorities decided that they should be moved and brought together in a common cemetery on state ground at Tjøtta. The cemetery was consecrated in 1953 and comprises an enclosed common grave to the north with 6,725 dead, and 826 individual graves to the south.

Further south the Tjøtta International War Cemetery was founded in 1970.

References

External links
 

Cemeteries in Norway
1953 establishments in Norway
World War II memorials